Mistrial is a 1996 American drama film written and directed by Heywood Gould and starring Bill Pullman, Jon Seda, and Robert Loggia. The film aired on HBO.

Plot
After community activist Eddie Rios (Seda), charged with the murder of two NYPD officers, one of them his ex-wife, is found not guilty due to legal technicalities, arresting detective Steve Donohue (Pullman) takes the judge, jury, and Rios hostage, and decides to have a new trial, presenting evidence that was not previously allowed. His captain Lou Unger (Loggia) tries to convince Donohue to end his hostage taking peaceably.

Cast
 Bill Pullman as Steve Donohue
 Robert Loggia as Captain Lou Unger
 Jon Seda as Eddie Rios
 Blair Underwood as Lieutenant C. Hodges
 Leo Burmester as Commissioner Russell Crane
 Roma Maffia as Laurie Meisinger
 James Rebhorn as Mayor Taylor
 Christina Cox as Officer Ida Cruz
 Josef Sommer as Nick Mirsky
 Penny Crone as Reporter

Background
Although the film was shot principally in Canada, the NYPD and other NYC sources were credited with assisting and advising.

Sources 

https://www.variety.com/profiles/TVMOW/main/55385/Mistrial.html?dataSet=1

1996 drama films
1996 films
HBO Films films
Films about hostage takings
American courtroom films
Films scored by Brad Fiedel
American drama television films
1990s English-language films
1990s American films